Collum humeri is Latin for neck of humerus, and may refer to:
Anatomical neck of humerus
Surgical neck of the humerus